The 131st Regiment of Xinjiang Production and Construction Corps, also known as the 131th Regiment of the XPCC, together with its reclamation area, commonly known as the 131st Regiment Farm, is an economic and paramilitary formed unit that is part of the 7th Division. The Regiment is headquartered at Junggar Road in Kuytun City, Xinjiang Uygur Autonomous Region. It is composed of 21 agriculture construction companies. As of 2010 census, its population was 24,154.

The 131th Regiment is located in the territories of Kuytun and Wusu cities. It is bordered by Kuytun River to the west, and to the south by the southwestern edge of Jungger Basin on the northern side of Tianshan. The regiment has plain farming areas and mountain pastures. It has an area of 779.846 square kilometers, of which 644.5767 square kilometers are in Kuytun and 129.2687 square kilometers in Wusu.

History
Based on Henan Zhibian Brigade with about a thousand people and some cadres and soldiers transferred from the 7th Division of the XPCC, Quytun Farm was incorporated in July 1956. The Quytun Farm was organized into the 131th Regiment, a separate paramilitary organization with serial number by Xinjiang Military District in 1969.

References 

Xinjiang Production and Construction Corps
Ili Kazakh Autonomous Prefecture